George Corsar (7 February 1886 – 16 September 1956) was a British cyclist. He competed in two events at the 1912 Summer Olympics.

References

External links
 

1886 births
1956 deaths
Place of death missing
British male cyclists
Olympic cyclists of Great Britain
Cyclists at the 1912 Summer Olympics
Sportspeople from Inverness